Sociedad Deportiva Noja is a Spanish football team based in Noja, in the autonomous community of Cantabria. Founded in 1963, it plays in Tercera División RFEF – Group 3, holding home games at Estadio La Caseta, with a capacity of 3,000 seats.

History
Founded in 1963, Noja had to wait until 1968 to start playing in the Segunda Regional, a new category created by the Cantabrian Football Federation. The club first reached Tercera División in 1987, and achieved a first-ever promotion to Segunda División B in 1998.

Immediately relegated back to the fourth tier, the club returned to the third division in 2002, and again suffered immediate relegation. In May 2012, they again promoted to division three, and achieved their best-ever finish in the category during the season by finishing ninth.

In June 2014, after suffering relegation to the fourth level, Noja was dropped one further category due to their debts with players and managers. The club only returned to a national division in 2021, reaching the newly-formed Tercera División RFEF.

Season to season

4 seasons in Segunda División B
22 seasons in Tercera División
1 season in Tercera División RFEF
27 seasons in Divisiones Regionales

Current squad

Famous players
 Chupe
 Kily
 Iván Zarandona
 Oussama Souaidy

References

External links
Official website 
Futbolme team profile 

Football clubs in Cantabria
Association football clubs established in 1963
1963 establishments in Spain